Michael Bowie (born September 25, 1991) is a former American football offensive tackle. He was drafted by the Seattle Seahawks in the seventh round of the 2013 NFL Draft. Bowie played college football for Northeastern State.

Professional career

Seattle Seahawks
Bowie was selected by the Seattle Seahawks in the seventh round (242nd pick overall) of the 2013 NFL Draft. Due to injuries in the starting line, Bowie get his first career start in the overtime win vs the Houston Texans and eventually came to start. Towards the end of the year, Pete Carroll decided to rotate offensive lineman based on situations; Bowie was used often in the rotation as both a tackle and a guard. Bowie won Super Bowl XLVIII with the Seahawks when they defeated the Denver Broncos, 43–8.

Bowie was waived on August 2, 2014.

Cleveland Browns
Bowie was claimed off waivers by the Cleveland Browns on August 3, 2014. The Browns placed Bowie on injured reserve with a shoulder injury on August 26, 2014.

The Browns placed Bowie on the reserve/retired list on August 5, 2016. He was released on September 30, 2016.

New York Giants
On January 12, 2017, Bowie signed a reserve/future contract with the Giants. On August 23, 2017, Bowie was waived by the Giants after being issued a warrant for his arrest on a domestic assault and battery charge.

References

External links

Seattle Seahawks bio
Oklahoma State Cowboys bio
NFL Draft profile

1991 births
Living people
American football offensive tackles
Cleveland Browns players
New York Giants players
Northeastern State RiverHawks football players
Oklahoma State Cowboys football players
Players of American football from Oklahoma
Seattle Seahawks players
Sportspeople from Tulsa, Oklahoma